Melaleuca adenostyla is a plant in the myrtle family, Myrtaceae and is endemic to the south-west of Western Australia.

Description

The flowers are cream coloured and arranged in a spike at the ends of branches which continue to grow after flowering. The stamens are arranged in five bundles around the flower, each bundle containing 11 to 21 stamens.

Melaleuca adenostyla resembles M. platycalyx except that the latter is somewhat smaller, has pinkish to mauve-coloured flowers and more (25-36) stamens in each bundle. M. adenostyla flowers have 11-21 stamens for each of its five bundles compared to 25-36 for M. platycalyx. The leaves of M. adenostyla are also narrower than those of M. platycalyx.

Taxonomy and naming
Melaleuca adenostyla was first formally described in 1999 by Kirsten Cowley in a review of Melaleuca fulgens from a specimen collected near Hyden. The specific epithet (adenostyla) means "glandular style".

Distribution and habitat
This melaleuca occurs in the Avon Wheatbelt and Mallee biogeographic regions of Western Australia from Dumbleyung east to the Hyden-Newdegate region of Western Australia. It grows in white or gravelly sand in saline floodways and depressions.

Conservation status
This species is classified as "not threatened" by the Government of Western Australia Department of Parks and Wildlife.

References 

adenostyla
Myrtales of Australia
Plants described in 1999
Endemic flora of Western Australia